Interstate 70 (I-70) in the US state of Indiana travels east–west across the state passing through the capital of Indianapolis. I-70 crosses from Illinois into Indiana near Terre Haute and departs into Ohio at Richmond.

Route description
The Indiana portion of I-70 begins at the Illinois state line west of Terre Haute. Heading east, I-70 crosses the Wabash River soon after entering the state. The Interstate crosses through the south side of Terre Haute, where it has an interchange with US 41/US 150. Just outside the city to the east, I-70 passes near Terre Haute Regional Airport, where US 40 leaves the Interstate before continuing onward to the east-northeast through rural lands toward Indianapolis. This stretch of I-70 does not have any interchanges with any significant cities until it reaches the Indianapolis metropolitan area, but it does pass within proximity of Greencastle.

Entering the Indianapolis area, I-70 passes through the southern reaches of Plainfield in Hendricks County, home to many logistics and warehousing companies. Shortly thereafter, it enters Marion County and the city of Indianapolis, passing just to the south of the Indianapolis International Airport, where the freeway now serves as the passenger terminal's main vehicular access point. At the far southeast corner of the airport, I-70 has an interchange with the I-465 circumferential for the first of two times at exit 73; however, motorists heading to the west or south legs of I-465 (or to the concurrent I-74) from eastbound I-70 must exit onto a parallel collector–distributor roadway nearly  prior (at exit 69) to reaching the actual crossing of the beltway. Once beyond the airport, I-70 curves first to the northeast, then to the east, before eventually crossing the White River and passing just to the south of Lucas Oil Stadium, Downtown Indianapolis, and the corporate headquarters campus of pharmaceutical giant Eli Lilly and Company before reaching I-65.

Turning north, the next section of I-70 along the east side of Downtown Indianapolis travels concurrent with I-65. The two major interchanges at either end of this concurrency are often referred to as the "North Split" and the "South Split", forming the eastern leg of a section of freeways and surface streets locally known as the "Inner Loop" (around the Indianapolis central business district as opposed to the "Outer Loop" of the I-465 beltway). The north split is also called the "Spaghetti Bowl" due to the visual complexity of the overlapping freeways, ghost ramps, and overpasses that were originally intended as a connection to a never-built portion of I-69. Access to I-69 requires using I-465. The "North Split" was closed for reconstruction in early 2021 and is expected to reopen to traffic in late 2022. As part of that reconstruction, the old ramps are being replaced with ones that will eliminate the lane switching that drivers originally had to perform to stay on I-70 eastbound and I-65 northbound.

Upon leaving I-65 at the north split, I-70 reaches a maximum width of 10 lanes (five in each direction) as it departs Downtown Indianapolis toward the east-northeast. On the east side of the city, I-70 again intersects with the I-465 beltway at another complex interchange before departing the city, county, and metro area in a nearly due-east direction toward Ohio.

The portion of I-70 east of Indianapolis has been designated as the "Anton Tony Hulman, Jr. Memorial Way". Tony Hulman is most known for rescuing the Indianapolis Motor Speedway in 1945 and making the Indianapolis 500 popular. This stretch of I-70 does not have any interchanges with any significant cities until it reaches Richmond, but it does pass within proximity of both Greenfield and New Castle. On the northwest side of Richmond, US 35 joins I-70 and remains on the freeway as both routes jointly cross into Ohio. It also has an interchange with US 27 providing access to Richmond south of the Interstate. On the east side of Richmond, US 40 intersects with I-70 immediately to the west of the Ohio state line.

History

Initial construction
Like all Interstate Highways in Indiana, I-70 was constructed in segments which, when all were complete, make up the route as it is today. There were three large segments in the western portion of the route between the Illinois border and I-465 in Indianapolis, and five more in the eastern portion connecting the east side of Indianapolis to Ohio. The urban portions through the capital city itself within I-465 were mostly deferred until the end of the Interstate construction process in the early to mid-1970s.

The first section of I-70 to be built in Indiana was the portion around Richmond east of the Centerville exit, which opened to traffic on September 17, 1961. The final portion outside of I-465 to be completed was the middle of the three western segments, located between State Road 46 (SR 46) near Terre Haute and SR 59, which opened on October 20, 1969. Within I-465, the short section between Shadeland Avenue (then SR 100) and the I-465 interchange had opened along with the rest of I-70 from that point east to SR 9 near Greenfield on December 2, 1968. Another section of I-70 on the southwest side of Indianapolis between the I-465 beltway and Holt Road had been completed and opened by December 10, 1969. But the remainder of the I-70 mileage through the heart of the city was not finished and open to traffic until October 1976.

Subsequent improvements
This reconstruction was done to allow expansion of runways at Indianapolis International Airport and to facilitate development of access roads from I-70 to the site of the new midfield Col. H. Weir Cook Passenger Terminal Building (which opened in 2008) at the airport.

Exit list

References

External links

Indiana Highway Ends: Interstate 70

 Indiana
70
Transportation in Indianapolis
Transportation in Vigo County, Indiana
Transportation in Clay County, Indiana
Transportation in Putnam County, Indiana
Transportation in Morgan County, Indiana
Transportation in Hendricks County, Indiana
Transportation in Marion County, Indiana
Transportation in Hancock County, Indiana
Transportation in Henry County, Indiana
Transportation in Wayne County, Indiana